The 4-metre (70 MHz) band is an amateur radio band within the lower part of the very high frequency (VHF) band.

As only a few countries within and outside of Europe have allocated the band for amateur radio access, the availability of dedicated commercially manufactured equipment is limited. Most radio amateurs active on the band are interested in home construction or the modification of private mobile radio (PMR) equipment. As a result, communication on the 4-metre band tends to focus on technical topics, with long 'rag chews' being the norm as long as there is some local activity.

History 

Before World War II, British community radio stations had been allocated a band at 56 MHz. After the war ended, they were moved to the 5-metre band (58.5–60 MHz) instead. This only lasted until 1949, as the 5-metre band was earmarked for BBC Television broadcasts. Meanwhile, in 1948, 72-72.8 MHz was allocated to France (until 1961).

In 1956, after several years of intense lobbying by the Radio Society of Great Britain (RSGB), the 4-metre band was allocated to British community radio stations as a replacement for the old 5-metre band allocation. For several years the 4-metre band allocation was only 200 kHz wide, from 70.2 to 70.4 MHz; it was later extended to 70.025–70.7 MHz. The band limits were subsequently moved to today's allocation of 70.0–70.5 MHz.

On the occasion of the International Geophysical Year 1957–1958, the following countries have been allocated frequencies between 70 and 72.8 MHz.
Ireland: 70.575-70.775 MHz, Finland: 70.2-70.3 MHz, Germany: 70.3-70.4 MHz, The Netherlands: 70.3-70.4 MHz, Norway: 70.6-72.0 MHz, 
Yugoslavia: 72.0-72.8 MHz, and Austria: 70 MHz special licences.

In March 1993 the European Radio Communications Office (now ECC) of the CEPT launched Phase II of a detailed spectrum investigation (DSI) covering the frequency range 29.7-960 MHz. The results were presented in March 1995. Regarding the Amateur Radio Service the DSI management team recommended (among other things) that 70 MHz be considered as an amateur band.

Allocations

In addition to the traditional users (United Kingdom, Gibraltar and the British Military Bases in Cyprus), an increasing number of countries in Europe and Africa have authorised the use of the 4-metre band to community radio stations. Movement away from the old Eastern European VHF FM broadcast band and migration of commercial stations to higher frequencies in recent times allowed a slow but constant growth in the number of countries where 4-metre amateur radio operation is permitted.

Whilst not formally allocated at an ITU or Regional level, in Europe CEPT now recognises the increased access to 70 MHz by community radio stations with footnote 'ECA9'. This regulatory allowance has helped underpin further growth and use of the band. In July 2015 CEPT updated this footnote to fully recognise it as a formal secondary allocation:

"ECA9: CEPT administrations may authorise all or parts of the band 69.9-70.5 MHz to the amateur service on a secondary basis."

In practice this ranges from 70 to 70.5 MHz in the United Kingdom, with other countries generally having a smaller allocation within this window. In most countries the maximum power permitted on the band is lower than in other allocations, to minimise the possibility of interference with non-amateur services especially in neighbouring countries. A table with national and regional allocations is published and regularly updated on the Four Metres Website.

Propagation
The 4-metre band shares many characteristics with the adjacent 6-metre band. As the band is higher in frequency, it does not display the same propagation mechanisms via the F2 ionospheric layer normally seen at HF which occasionally appear in 6 metres, leastwise not at temperate latitudes. However, sporadic E is common on the band during the summer season and tropospheric propagation is marginally more successful than on the 6-metre band, with propagation via the Aurora Borealis and meteor scatter generally highly effective.

While sporadic E permits Europe wide communication, the band is still used for wide bandwidth, high power FM broadcasting on the OIRT FM band in a declining number of Eastern European countries. Although broadcasting has lessened in recent years, it can still be a source of considerable interference to both local and long distance (DX) operation.

The first ever transequatorial propagation (TEP) contact on 70 MHz took place on 28 March 2011 between Leonidas Fiskars, SV2DCD, in Greece and Willem Badenhorst, ZS6WAB, in South Africa.

Equipment and power
Access to the 4-metre band remains challenging due to limited availability of commercial 4-metre transceivers and radio equipment in general. A small number of transceiver models were purposely built for amateurs on this band, while converted private mobile radio equipment such as the Philips FM1000 and the Ascom SE550, is in widespread use.

In the sporadic E seasons, communication around Europe is possible with such equipment. Currently, the only Japanese-made, "mass-market" amateur radio transceivers to cover the 4-metre band as standard are the Kenwood TS 890, ICOM IC-7100 and IC-7300 (UK models), previously there was the UK specification Yaesu FT-847 with 4 m which was discontinued in 2005. As a result, many 4-metre users gain access to the band by using converted "Low band" VHF ex-PMR (private mobile radio) transceivers but invariably these only have either AM or FM and those users who prefer to have a multi-mode capability but can't afford a secondhand Yaesu FT-847, normally use transverters, either purposely built home builds or sometimes even converted 6-metre or 2-metre versions.

In recent years there have been extensive imports of Chinese PMR transceivers such as the Wouxun KG-699E 4 m (66–88 MHz) and KG-UVD1P1LV dual band (TX / RX 66–88 MHz / 136–174 MHz) handheld transceiver to Western countries, mainly so far in the UK and mainland Europe. Qixiang Electronics, the makers of the AnyTone and MyDel transceivers, have exported the AnyTone 5189 PMR 4 m mobile, and the AnyTone 3308 handheld (66–88 MHz) transceivers from China to the UK and to Europe. Both transceivers have been selling extensively well in the UK and in Europe.

Circa 2014 a mono-band multi-mode 70 MHz SSB / CW transceiver was released by Noble Radio. As of October 2014, their 70 MHz transceiver is worldwide the only one available.

Most modern radios support the 4-meter band (software-defined radios – SDRs and others).  Examples are the Flex Radio Systems 6000 series, ICOM IC-7300, Yaesu FT-DX101d, and Kenwood TS-890S.

Activity

United Kingdom
In the UK the band has a mix of AM, FM and DX activity, assisted by the recent support for 70 MHz in newer amateur radio equipment. In the UK, the band is also used for emergency communications, Internet Radio Linking Project links (IRLP), data links and low powered remote control.

Ireland
There is considerable AM activity in the Dublin area.  As band occupancy is relatively low, FM operation tends to take place on the 70.450 MHz calling frequency, and AM operation on the 70.260 MHz calling frequency.

Continental Europe
In Europe the band is still primarily used for more serious DX operation. Cross-band working between the 6-metre band or the 10-metre band is common to make contacts countries where the band is not allocated.

DX operation across Europe and beyond
During the European summer season, the band is frequently open for DX work across the continent, with the centre of activity for long distance voice and digital/data communication situated in the lower part of the band. The compact size of both horizontal and vertical antennas designed for the 70 MHz band is beneficial to radio amateurs who enjoy DX work but have insufficient space for larger multi-element antennas designed for lower frequencies.

DX voice traffic in SSB mode can be found around the SSB calling frequency of 70.200 MHz, whereas AM/FM contacts tend can be initiated at the 70.260 MHz AM/FM centre of activity. When the band conditions are poor or in cases where stations operator are able to transmit with modest power levels only, modern digital modes, capable of decoding transmissions down to a -12 dB s/n level, such as PSK31, Thor or Olivia, still permit reliable keyboard-to-keyboard free text communications at relatively large distances. Other more resilient digital modes capable of decoding signal down to -20 dB s/n, such as FT8, JT9 and JT65, offer reliable signal report exchanges at distances of up to several hundred or several thousand kilometres, depending on band conditions.

Countries in which operation is permitted

Countries with a known band allocation:

Bahrain (69.900–70.400 MHz)
Belgium (69.950 MHz center frequency, 70.125–70.4125)
Bosnia and Herzegovina (68–70.45 MHz)
Bulgaria (70–70.5 MHz)
Croatia (70.000–70.450 MHz)
Czech Republic (70.100–70.300 MHz)
Cyprus (69.900–70.500 MHz)
Denmark (69.8875–70.0625, 70.0875–70.1125 and 70.1375–70.5125 MHz) (69.9 and 70.5 MHz used for/by repeaters)
Estonia (70.000–70.300 MHz)
Faroe Islands (69.950–70.500 MHz)
Finland (70.000–70.300 MHz)
Åland
Germany (70.150-70.210 MHZ) 
Greece (70.000–70.250 MHz)
Greenland (70.000–70.500 MHz)
Hungary (70.000–70.500 MHz)
Ireland (69.900–70.500 MHz)
Israel (70.000-70.500 MHz)
Latvia (70.000–70.500 MHz)
Lithuania (70.240–70.250 MHz)
Luxembourg (70.150–70.250 MHz)
Malta (70.000–70.500 MHz)
Monaco (70.000–70.500 MHz)
Montenegro (70.050–70.450 MHz)
Namibia (70.000–70.300 MHz)
Netherlands (70.000–70.500 MHz)
Norway (69.9–70.5 MHz)
Poland (70.0–70.3 MHz)
Portugal (70.1570–70.2125 and 70.2375–70.2875 MHz)
Azores
Madeira
Romania (70.000–70.300 MHz)
 Serbia (69.900-70.500 MHz)
Slovakia (70.000–70.500 MHz)
Slovenia (70.000–70.450 MHz)
Somalia (70.000–70.500 MHz)
South Africa (70.000–70.500 MHz)
Spain (70.150–70.250 MHz)
Switzerland (70.0000MHz-70.0375MHz and 70.1125-70.5000MHz) 
United Arab Emirates (70.000–70.500 MHz)
United Kingdom (70.000–70.500 MHz)
Gibraltar
Guernsey
Isle of Man
Jersey
St. Helena

Countries with past or current experimental operation
In "experimental" countries, authorities authorized amateur radio experiments on the band for a limited period of time.

Germany 2007-2010 (69.950 MHz center frequency) under a special ("DI2xx") license. 
For class "A" operators in 2014, 70.000-70.030 MHz, and in 2015, 2017, & 2018, 70.150-70.180 MHz were allocated under specific restrictions (25 W ERP, Horiz. polarisation, 12 kHz maximum bandwidth, no portable operation, non interference basis, all transmissions to be logged with frequency, antenna direction, date/time, call signs) for four months, Starting May 2 and ending at the end of August each year (effectively for the sporadic-E season).

On December 19, 2018 BNetzA (the German regulator) published announcement 414/2018 issuing immediate access to 70.150-70.200 MHz for German class "A" (full) licensees up until December 31, 2019 with the same rules as shown above.
Sovereign UK bases in Cyprus (70.000–70.500 MHz)
An automatic beacon has also been authorized in Austria, Cyprus, and Hungary
North Macedonia 70.000 MHz, 70.075 MHz, 70.125 MHz and 70.275 MHz Starting in May 2019, N. Macedonia amateurs may apply for a one-year experimental permit granting access to 4 meters.
Italy (70.0875–70.1125, 70.1875–70.2125, and 70.2875–70.3125 MHz) only on temporary basis during 2007-2008-2010-2012-2014

Others
 United States has one experimental transmitter, station WE9XFT in Virginia, transmitting CW on 70.005 MHz.  The beacon continues to be operated under the Experimental radio service callsign WG2XPN and is active as of March 2021.
 A petition was filed with the U.S. Federal Communications Commission on 27 January 2010 to create a new U.S. 4-meter amateur radio allocation at 70 MHz to parallel those in Europe and other parts of the world. This petition was subsequently rejected by the FCC.

Common uses of the 4-metre band
 FM simplex
 AM simplex
 Packet radio
 SSB voice operation
 Morse code (CW) operation
 DX

References

External links
 
  – was "DX-Sherlock's real-time 4 m propagation maps", prior to a domain merger.
  – was "DX-Sherlock's real-time VHF&up propagation ticker", prior to a domain merger.
 

Amateur radio bands